Golden Rooster for Best Directorial Debut (中国电影金鸡奖最佳导演处女作) is the main category of Competition of Golden Rooster Awards, awarding to new director who directed the first feature film.

1980s

1990s

2000s

2010s

2020s

References

Directorial Debut, Best
Directorial debut film awards